Robert "Bob" Rooney was a U.S. soccer center forward who spent his playing career in the St. Louis leagues.  He also earned two caps with the U.S. national team in 1957.

Personal
Rooney grew up in the Dogtown area of St. Louis, attending St. James Grade School and St. Louis University High School.  As a youth, he played both football and baseball in addition to soccer spending five seasons with a St. Louis Cardinals farm team.  Even while playing in the local St. Louis soccer leagues, Rooney earned a living as a St. Louis policeman.

Club career
Rooney played for the St. James the Greater Grade School boys' soccer team in the CYC league in 1945.
and for St. Louis Kutis S.C. during the mid-1950s when they were a dominant U.S. team.  Kutis won the 1957 National Amateur Cup and National Challenge Cup.  He was inducted into the St. Louis Soccer Hall of Fame in 1984.

National team
After Kutis won the 1957 National Cup, the US Football Association decided to call up the entire team to represent the U.S. in two World Cup qualification games.  As a result, Rooney earned two caps with the U.S. national team, both losses to Canada.  The first was a 5-1 loss on June 22, 1957.  The second game was a July 6 loss to Canada.

References

United States men's international soccer players
St. Louis Kutis players
Living people
American soccer players
Association football forwards
Year of birth missing (living people)
Soccer players from St. Louis
American municipal police officers